Nasty may refer to:

Arts, entertainment and media

Music 
 Nasty (album), a 1996 album by Cameo
 Nasty (mixtape), a 2018 mixtape by Rico Nasty
 Nasty, a 1981 album by Ronald Shannon Jackson
 "Nasty" (Bandit Gang Marco song), 2015
 "Nasty" (Janet Jackson song), 1986
 "Nasty" (Kid Ink song)
 "Nasty" (Nas song)
 "Nasty" (Parris Goebel song)
 "Nasty" (Pixie Lott song), 2014
 "Nasty" (The Prodigy song), 2015
 "Nasty", a song by Brooke Candy, 2016
 "Nasty", a song by Ariana Grande, 2020
 "Nasty", a song by The Damned, created for the episode of The Young Ones (see below), released as the B-side of the single "Thanks for the Night"

Other uses in arts, entertainment and media 
 Nasty (film), a 2008 Czech film
 "Nasty" (The Young Ones), a 1984 episode of The Young Ones

Other uses 
 Nasty, Hertfordshire, a village in England
 Nasty, a nickname for Ilie Năstase (born 1946), Romanian retired tennis player
 -nasty, in biology, a response of a plant to a stimulus, that does not depend on where the stimulus comes from
 Nasty class or Tjeld class patrol boat, a type of motor torpedo boat
 Video nasty, a term referring to violent video recordings.

See also 
 Billy Nasty
 Dag Nasty
 Dee Nasty (born 1960)
 Freak Nasty
 Freq Nasty
 "Make It Nasty"
 Nas (born 1973), formerly Nasty Nas, American rapper
 Nasty C (born 1997), South African Rapper 
 Nasty, brutish, and short
 Nasty, inebriated
 Nasty, Live & Funky
 Nasty Canasta
 Nasty Nasty (band), a South Korean trio group
 Nasty Party, term used for the British Conservative Party, discussed in a speech by Theresa May in 2002
 Nasty Suicide (born 1963)
 Pink Nasty
 You Nasty